Huck may refer to:

Characters
 Huckleberry Finn, a character in four novels by Mark Twain
 Huckleberry Hound, a cartoon character created by animation studio Hanna-Barbera
 Huck, a character on Scandal
 Huck, a character in the eponymous comic book series by Mark Millar

People
 Huck (surname)
 Huck (nickname)

Other uses
 Huck Magazine, a bi-monthly, independent magazine, website and video platform 
 A deep throw for high gain toward the end-zone in the sport of Ultimate

See also
 Huckleberry (disambiguation)
 Hucks, a surname and given name
 Hueck (surname)